Great Hearts Arete Prep (formerly Arete Preparatory Academy (formerly Mesa Preparatory Academy)) is a charter school in Mesa, Arizona. It is part of Great Hearts Academies.

In 2014, the school moved to a location in Gilbert. The school changed its name to Great Hearts Arete Prep and its mascot from Monsoons to Chargers.

Curriculum
The school's curriculum places a heavy emphasis on the Greco-Roman world and classical studies, with students studying Latin in middle school and, if elected, Greek in high school.

Athletics
Arete Prep (while under the Mesa Prep name) became a full member of the Arizona Interscholastic Association for high school athletics in the 2012-13 school year.

In May 2012, Mesa Preparatory Academy won the Charter Athletic Association state baseball championship, after Our Lady of Sorrows Academy in Phoenix, a traditionalist Catholic school affiliated with the Society of St. Pius X, refused to play in (and thus forfeited) the championship game against Mesa Prep because MPA's team included a female infielder.

References

External links

Public high schools in Arizona
Charter schools in Arizona
Public middle schools in Arizona